Marc Brisfer (born 8 May 1956) is a French water polo player. He competed in the men's tournament at the 1988 Summer Olympics.

References

External links
 

1956 births
Living people
French male water polo players
Olympic water polo players of France
Water polo players at the 1988 Summer Olympics
Sportspeople from Tourcoing